Skinwalker is a 2021 American Western thriller film written and directed by Robert Conway. It stars Eva Hamilton, Cameron Kotecki and Amelia Haberman. The film was released on DVD and digital platforms on July 13, 2021.

Plot
When two Cowboys rob a Native American burial site, a hunter takes the famous Skinwalker, a monster that changes shape, into an unheard-of world.

Cast
 Eva Hamilton as Maisie
 Cameron Kotecki as Riggs
 Amelia Haberman as Nellie
 Dan Higgins as Bascom
 Daniel Link as Willard
 Charlie E Motley as Vern

References

External links
 
 

2021 films
2021 thriller films
American thriller films
2020s English-language films
Films directed by Robert Conway
2020s American films